The Questor Grand Prix was a non-championship race for Formula One and Formula 5000 cars held on 28 March 1971 to inaugurate a new racing facility in California, the Ontario Motor Speedway, built by the Questor conglomerate.

Because of the smaller fuel tanks of the F5000 cars, the race was run in two heats of 32 laps, and the final result decided by a points system. Jackie Stewart qualified on pole for Heat 1 and finished runner-up behind Mario Andretti. Chris Amon set fastest lap. Andretti and Stewart again finished first and second in Heat 2 and Pedro Rodriguez set fastest lap, quicker than Amon's time in Heat 1. Mario Andretti was declared the winner; with Stewart in second place and Denny Hulme third. Mark Donohue was the best-placed F5000 finisher in Heat 1, and Ron Grable best in Heat 2. Grable was also the best-placed F5000 driver on aggregate.

Hopes for a regular fixture rapidly faded due to financial problems; the Questor Grand Prix remained a one-off event and the Ontario Motor Speedway was never again host to Formula One cars.

Qualifying

Note: a blue background indicates a Formula 5000 entrant.

1 Hobbs, Lovely and Byers were late entries and relegated to reserve drivers.
2 Stewart briefly drove Foyt's car in qualifying.

Classification

Note: a blue background indicates a Formula 5000 entrant.

References
 http://www.silhouet.com/motorsport/archive/f1/nc/1971/1971.html#qgp
 http://www.formula2.net/F171_7.htm
 http://second-a-lap.blogspot.co.uk/2013/05/the-questor-grand-prix.html
 https://web.archive.org/web/20151124114931/http://counter-x.net/f1/questor/
 https://www.oldracingcars.com/f1/results/1971/questor/

1971 Formula One races
1971 in American motorsport
1971 in sports in California
Motorsport in California